The RD-215 (GRAU Index 8D513) was a dual nozzle liquid rocket engine, burning AK-27 (a mixture of 73% nitric acid and 27% N2O4 + iodine passivant) and UDMH. It was used in a module of two engines (four nozzles) known as the RD-216 (GRAU Index 8D514). The RD-215 was developed by OKB-456 for Yangel's Yuzhmash R-14 (8K65) ballistic missile. Its variations were also used on the Kosmos-1, Kosmos-3 and Kosmos-3M launch vehicles.

Versions
The family incorporate many versions:
RD-215: GRAU Index 8D513. Original design for the R-14 (8K65). Used also on the Kosmos-1 and Kosmos-3
RD-215U: GRAU Index 8D513U. Improved engine for the R-14U (8K65U).
RD-215M: GRAU Index 8D513M. Improved version used on the Kosmos-3M.
RD-217: GRAU Index 8D515. Modified design for the R-16 (8K64) first stage.
RD-219: GRAU Index 8D713. Modified design for the R-16 (8K64) second stage.

Modules
These engines were bundled into modules of pairs of engines. The serial production modules were:
RD-216: GRAU Index 8D514. Bundle of two RD-215, used on the R-14 (8K65), Kosmos-1 and Kosmos-3 first stage.
RD-216U: GRAU Index 8D514U. Bundle of two RD-215U, used on the R-14U (8K65U) first stage.
RD-216M: GRAU Index 8D514M. Bundle of two RD-215M, used on the Kosmos-3M first stage.
RD-218: GRAU Index 8D712. Bundle of three RD-217, powers the R-16 (8K64) first stage.

See also

R-14 - Ballistic missile for which this engine was originally developed for.
Kosmos-3 - launch vehicle that is uses an R-14 as first stage.
Kosmos-3M - launch vehicle that is uses an R-14 as first stage.
Rocket engine using liquid fuel

References

External links 
 NPO Energomash official site.

Rocket engines of the Soviet Union